Chrysoesthia aletris is a moth of the family Gelechiidae. It is found on Sicily.

The wingspan is about 6.5 mm. The forewings are mealy whitish, dusted with fuscous, except on a terminal band on the costa. The hindwings are shining steel grey.

References

Moths described in 1919
Chrysoesthia
Moths of Europe